The KPL Top 8 Cup (also known as the KPL Top 8 Knockout, the KPL Top 8 Knockout Cup or simply the Top 8 Knockout, the Top 8 Cup or the Kenyan Top 8 Cup) is a Kenyan football championship contested by the top eight teams of the preceding Kenyan Premier League (KPL) season. The inaugural edition of the tournament took place in 2011, with Ulinzi Stars as the winners.

Format
The tournament is played in both a single-elimination and double-elimination format. It begins with the quarter-finals, where teams play against each other once. In the semi-finals, teams play each other in two matches and the team with more goals on aggregate advances to the final, which is played once. No third place playoff is played.

The winners of the tournament receive a total sum of KSh.1,000,000/= as prize money, although appeals to the Football Kenya Federation have been made to increase the sum as gate collections in the tournament surpass the prize money amount.

Finals by year

References

External links
Futaa.com - Top 8 Cup
Kenyan Premier League - Official website

 
Football competitions in Kenya
Top